Municipal Stadium was a multi-use stadium next to the Castra of Brașov in Braşov, Romania. It was used mostly for football matches, different teams from Braşov having played on it. The stadium had a capacity of 30,000 people.

Defunct football venues in Romania
Demolished buildings and structures in Romania
Buildings and structures in Brașov